Berlyn B. Brixner (May 21, 1911 – August 1, 2009) was an American photographer. He was the head photographer for the Trinity test, the first detonation of a nuclear weapon in July 1945.

Early years
He was born in El Paso, Texas on May 21, 1911. His mother had graduated from Western New Mexico University in 1898 and taught school in various small southern New Mexico communities.  His father was a power systems engineer for a mining company, and had worked in Chile, Mexico and the Fanny Mine in Mogollon, New Mexico until the Army commandeered its boxcar-size generators at the beginning of World War II turning Mogollon into a ghost town.

On December 11, 1932, he fell into Kilbourne Hole near Lanark, New Mexico and broke his ankle.
 
Brixner attended the University of Texas at Austin for four years without earning a degree, then worked and studied photography under Willis W. Waite, who operated a pathology laboratory in El Paso.  In 1936, Brixner worked as a regional photographer with the Soil Conservation Service at its four-state headquarters in Albuquerque, New Mexico. He married his first wife, Betty, around 1940. His two daughters, Annette (born 1942) and Kathleen (born 1943) were born in Albuquerque.  During World War II, he was hired at the Los Alamos National Laboratory to work on photography problems connected with the Manhattan Project in the Optics Engineering and High Speed Photography Group in Los Alamos under the direction of Professor Julian Mack, the group invented and constructed extremely high speed cameras.

Trinity
Brixner was assigned to shoot movies in 16-millimeter black-and-white film, from every angle and distance and at every available speed, of an unknown event beginning with the brightest flash ever produced on Earth. "The theoretical people had calculated a some 10-sun brightness. So that was easy," said Brixner. "All I had to do was go out and point my camera at the sun and take some pictures. Ten times that was easy to calculate."

At ignition, Brixner remembers "The whole filter seemed to light up as bright as the sun. I was temporarily blinded. I looked to the side. The Oscura mountains were as bright as day. I saw this tremendous ball of fire, and it was rising. I was just spellbound! I followed it as it rose. Then it dawned on me. I'm the photographer! I've gotta get that ball of fire." He jogged the camera up. He said: "There was no sound! It all took place in absolute silence."

Later years
After the war, he stayed on at Los Alamos National Laboratory until retirement as head of the optical group. In 1956 he married Audrey Chew (1915–1996) who was from Washington, DC. Berlyn Brixner died peacefully in Albuquerque on August 1, 2009. He was 98.

Legacy
His papers are archived at Los Alamos National Laboratory. He authored or co-authored over 45 papers describing major developments in camera engineering, optical instrumentation and fabrication techniques.  His optical lens design was used to construct a high resolution telescope mounted on the Mariner 1969 and 1970 spacecraft to Mars.  He received the DuPont gold medal from the Society of Motion Picture and Television Engineers and the Robert Gordon Memorial Award from the Society of Photo-Optical Instrumentation Engineers.

Patents
 Ultra High Speed Shutter (1953)
 Continuous Recording High Speed Camera Frame (1954)
 Wide Angle Optical System Having a Telecentric Stop (1966)

See also
 Jack Aeby – photographer of the only successful color picture of the Trinity Test.

References

Further reading
Robert Del Tredici, At Work in the Fields of the Bomb (Vancouver, B.C. : Douglas & McIntyre, 1987). (Features an extensive interview with Brixner.)

External links

1992 Video Interview with Berlyn Brixner by Yvonne Delamater Voices of the Manhattan Project

1911 births
2009 deaths
20th-century American photographers
Artists from New Mexico
Manhattan Project people
People from El Paso, Texas
University of Texas at Austin alumni
Los Alamos National Laboratory personnel